Dell Fluid File System, or FluidFS, is a shared-disk filesystem made by Dell that provides distributed file systems to clients. Customers buy an appliance: a combination of purpose-built network-attached storage (NAS) controllers with integrated primary and backup power supplies (i.e., the appliance) attached to block level storage via the iSCSI or Fiber Channel protocol.  A single Dell FluidFS appliance consists of two controllers operating in concert (i.e., active/active) connecting to the back-end storage area network (SAN). Depending on the storage capacity requirements and user preference, FluidFS version 4 NAS appliances can be used with Compellent or EqualLogic SAN arrays. The EqualLogic FS7600 and FS7610 connect to the client network and to Dell's EqualLogic arrays with either 1 Gbit/s (FS7600) or 10 Gbit/s (FS7610) iSCSI protocol.  For Compellent, FluidFS is available with either 1 Gbit/s or 10 Gbit/s iSCSI connectivity to the client network and connection to the backend Compellent SAN can be either 8 Gbit/s Fibre Channel or 10 Gbit/s iSCSI.

The FluidFS software layer running on the NAS Appliance creates a single name-space to the users, offering access via Server Message Block (SMB) and Network File System (NFS). It also includes features to prevent data-loss or corruption and uses caching to increase performance.

History
FluidFS is the result of Dell's acquisition of intellectual property from Exanet, a firm whose assets included a hardware-independent, scalable NAS storage product. Previously known as the Dell Scalable File System (DSFS), Dell changed the name to FluidFS after its acquisition of Compellent, which successfully used the Fluid Data tag-line as a startup company. Dell further developed the Exanet file system to support NDMP backup and integrated it with the IP obtained from the acquisition of Ocarina Networks, which included deduplication and data compression technology.  Dell initially adapted FluidFS to work with its Compellent, EqualLogic, and PowerVault storage platforms.

Architecture
The underlying software architecture of FluidFS employs a Linux-based symmetric clustering model with distributed metadata, native load balancing, flexible caching capabilities and other features. Its scalability is not limited by volume size as with traditional file systems, and supports scaling up (adding capacity to the system) and by scaling out (adding nodes, or performance, to the system). FluidFS operates across a symmetric cluster of purpose-built NAS controllers (housed in pairs within a 2U appliance), which interface over a fabric to shared back-end storage via iSCSI or Fibre Channel storage area networks.

The FluidFS architecture is layered, and presents a traditional file system to network clients while performing special functions at the back end. This is designed to utilize all available resources at the network, server and disk levels to improve response times.

Capacity
Based on the back-end storage product the maximum number of NAS appliances and storage capacity varies. The number of NAS appliances varies from 1 to 4. The entire capacity of the system can be managed in a single global namespace, and as of FluidFS v6 supports multitenancy and a total storage capacity of tens of PB. The maximum size of any single file is 128 TB. The number of files the name-space is limited to 64 billion per appliance, or 256 billion in 4 appliances, making it one of the largest in the industry.

References

External links
 FluidFS technical content

Fluid FS
FluidFS
Disk file systems